The Gillett School District, also known as Gillett Public Schools was a school district headquartered in Gillett, Arkansas.

As of circa 2000 it had about 280 students. It was administratively divided into two schools: Gillett Elementary School and Gillett High School.

On July 1, 2004, it, along with the Humphrey School District, consolidated into the DeWitt School District.

References

Further reading
 2004-2005 School District Map
 Map of Arkansas School Districts pre-July 1, 2004
  (Download) - Includes the boundary of the Gillett district

External links
 

Education in Arkansas County, Arkansas
Defunct school districts in Arkansas
2004 disestablishments in Arkansas
School districts disestablished in 2004